The 2009 World Wrestling Championships were held at the Messecenter Herning in Herning, Denmark. The event took place from September 21 to September 27, 2009.

Medal table

Team ranking

Medal summary

Men's freestyle

Men's Greco-Roman

Women's freestyle

Participating nations
639 competitors from 70 nations participated.

 (1)
 (15)
 (1)
 (6)
 (19)
 (20)
 (9)
 (17)
 (1)
 (14)
 (20)
 (1)
 (4)
 (14)
 (9)
 (7)
 (5)
 (6)
 (3)
 (7)
 (10)
 (14)
 (15)
 (5)
 (8)
 (14)
 (17)
 (14)
 (4)
 (6)
 (9)
 (21)
 (1)
 (21)
 (13)
 (6)
 (9)
 (2)
 (4)
 (10)
 (13)
 (2)
 (1)
 (1)
 (3)
 (8)
 (5)
 (18)
 (1)
 (2)
 (14)
 (21)
 (3)
 (4)
 (1)
 (4)
 (4)
 (17)
 (14)
 (9)
 (4)
 (3)
 (3)
 (19)
 (2)
 (21)
 (21)
 (14)
 (19)
 (6)

References
Results

External links
Official website

 
FILA Wrestling World Championships
Wrestling World Championships
World Wrestling Championships
Wrestling World Championships
Wrestling in Denmark